Akbudak, formerly and still informally called Süpürgüç ('holy saviour'), is a village in the Araban District, Gaziantep Province, Turkey. The village was formerly inhabited by Armenians until the Armenian genocide, after which Kurds settled in the village.

References

Villages in Araban District
Kurdish settlements in Gaziantep Province
Former Armenian communities in Turkey